Naiki Duniya (Transl.: The New World) is a Bhojpuri play written by Rahul Sankrityayan in 1942. It was written during the time of world war when Rahul Sankrityayan was in Hazaribagh jail. The play has four acts and promotes the idea of Communism. In this play, a communist society is imagined where every one is equal and there is not any distinction of rich and poor and everyone worships labours. The village is fully developed with all the required facilities.

Characters 

 Batuk : The main character
Sona : Batuk's wife
Ramdhani : Batuk's father
Jagrani : Batuk's Grandmother
Ramdeo Singh: An old man
Ramesar Tiwari : An old Brahmin
Khusari : Sarpanch
Other Characters: Sukarulla, Visnudeo Parsad, Sugiya, Batuliya, Mahdei

References

1942 plays
Indian plays
Bhojpuri-language culture
Works about communism